Slope is a village east of Hrpelje in the Municipality of Hrpelje-Kozina in the Littoral region of Slovenia close to the border with Croatia.

Church
The local church is dedicated to the Feast of the Cross and belongs to the Parish of Brezovica.

Mass grave
Slope is the site of a mass grave associated with the Second World War. The Kotar Enclosure Cave Mass Grave is located in a woods northeast of Tublje pri Hrpeljah. It contains the remains of 15 to 17 people, probably German soldiers and Slovene civilians.

References

External links
Slope on Geopedia

Populated places in the Municipality of Hrpelje-Kozina